In mathematics, Riemann–Hilbert problems, named after Bernhard Riemann and David Hilbert, are a class of problems that arise in the study of differential equations in the complex plane. Several existence theorems for Riemann–Hilbert problems have been produced by Mark Krein, Israel Gohberg and others (see the book by Clancey and Gohberg (1981)).

The Riemann problem
The classical problem, considered in Riemann's PhD dissertation (see ), was that of finding a function

analytic inside  such that the boundary values of M+ along  satisfy the equation

for all , where a, b, and c are given real-valued functions .

By the Riemann mapping theorem, it suffices to consider the case when  is the unit circle . In this case, one may seek M+(z) along with its Schwarz reflection:

On the unit circle Σ, one has , and so

Hence the problem reduces to finding a pair of functions M+(z) and M−(z) analytic, respectively, on the inside and the outside of the unit disc, so that on the unit circle

and, moreover, so that the condition at infinity holds:

The Hilbert problem
Hilbert's generalization was to consider the problem of attempting to find M+ and M− analytic, respectively, on the inside and outside of the curve Σ, such that on  one has

where α, β, and c are arbitrary given complex-valued functions (no longer just complex conjugates).

Riemann–Hilbert problems
In the Riemann problem as well as Hilbert's generalization, the contour  was simple. A full Riemann–Hilbert problem allows that the contour may be composed of a union of several oriented smooth curves, with no intersections.

for all z ∈ Σ.

Generalization: Matrix factorization problems
Given an oriented "contour" Σ (technically: an oriented union of smooth curves without points of infinite self-intersection in the complex plane), a Riemann–Hilbert factorization problem is the following.

Given a matrix function V defined on the contour Σ, to find a holomorphic matrix function M defined on the complement of Σ, such that two conditions be satisfied:

 If M+ and M− denote the non-tangential limits of M as we approach Σ, then M+ = M−V, at all points of non-intersection in Σ.
As z tends to infinity along any direction outside Σ, M tends to the identity matrix.

In the simplest case V is smooth and integrable. In more complicated cases it could have singularities. The limits M+ and M− could be classical and continuous or they could be taken in the L2 sense.
At end-points or intersection points of the contour Σ the jump condition is not defined; constraints on the growth of M near those points have to be posed to ensure uniqueness (see the scalar problem below).

Applications to integrability theory 

Riemann–Hilbert problems have applications to several related classes of problems.

A. Integrable models The inverse scattering or inverse spectral problem associated to the Cauchy problems for 1+1 dimensional partial differential equations on the line, or to periodic problems, or even to initial-boundary value problems, can be stated as a Riemann–Hilbert problem. Likewise the inverse monodromy problem for Painlevé equations can be stated as a Riemann–Hilbert problem.

B. Orthogonal polynomials, Random matrices Given a weight on a contour, the corresponding orthogonal polynomials can be computed via the solution of a Riemann–Hilbert factorization problem. Furthermore, the distribution of eigenvalues of random matrices in several classical ensembles is reduced to computations involving orthogonal polynomials (see for example ).

Together with the study of B above, it is one of the original rigorous investigations of so-called "integrable probability". But the connection between the theory of integrability and various classical ensembles of random matrices goes back to the work of Dyson (e.g.).

The numerical analysis of Riemann–Hilbert problems can provide an effective way for numerically solving integrable PDEs, see eg. Trogdon & Olver (2016).

Use for asymptotics
In particular, Riemann–Hilbert factorization problems are used to extract asymptotic values for the three problems above (say, as time goes to infinity, or as the dispersion coefficient goes to zero, or as the polynomial degree goes to infinity, or as the size of the permutation goes to infinity). There exists a method for extracting the asymptotic behavior of solutions of Riemann–Hilbert problems, analogous to the method of stationary phase and the method of steepest descent applicable to exponential integrals.

By analogy with the classical asymptotic methods, one "deforms" Riemann–Hilbert problems which are not explicitly solvable to problems that are. A crucial ingredient of the Deift–Zhou analysis is the asymptotic analysis of singular integrals on contours. The relevant kernel is the standard Cauchy kernel (see ; also cf. the scalar example below).

This was inspired by work of Lax, Levermore and Venakides, who reduced the analysis of the small dispersion limit of the KdV equation to the analysis of a maximization problem for a logarithmic potential under some external field: a variational problem of "electrostatic" type. The g-function is the logarithmic transform of the maximizing "equilibrium" measure. The analysis of the small dispersion limit of KdV equation has in fact provided the basis for the analysis of most of the work concerning "real" orthogonal polynomials (i.e. with the orthogonality condition defined on the real line) and Hermitian random matrices.
 
In that case, actual "steepest descent contours" are defined and computed. The corresponding variational problem is a max-min problem: one looks for a contour that minimizes the "equilibrium" measure.

Their method is based on the analysis of d-bar problems, rather than the asymptotic analysis of singular integrals on contours.

Another extension of the theory appears in  where the underlying space of the Riemann–Hilbert problem is a compact hyperelliptic Riemann surface. The correct factorization problem is no more holomorphic, but rather meromorphic, by reason of the Riemann–Roch theorem.  The related singular kernel is not the usual Cauchy kernel, but rather a more general kernel involving meromorphic differentials defined naturally on the surface (see e.g. the appendix in ). The Riemann–Hilbert problem deformation theory is applied to the problem of stability of the infinite periodic Toda lattice under a "short range" perturbation (for example a perturbation of a finite number of particles).

Most Riemann–Hilbert factorization problems studied in the literature are 2-dimensional, i.e., the unknown matrices are of dimension 2. Higher-dimensional problems have been studied by Arno Kuijlaars and collaborators, see e.g. .

Example: Scalar Riemann–Hilbert factorization problem
Suppose V = 2, and Σ is a contour from z = −1 to z = 1. Assuming M is bounded, what is the solution of M?

To solve this, let's take the logarithm of equation .

Since M tends to 1, log M → 0 as z → ∞.

A standard fact about the Cauchy transform is that  where  are the limits of the Cauchy transform from above and below Σ; therefore, we get

Because the solution M of a Riemann–Hilbert factorization problem is unique (an easy application of Liouville's theorem (complex analysis)), the Sokhotski–Plemelj theorem gives the solution. We get

i.e.

which has a branch cut at contour .

Check:

therefore,

CAVEAT 1: If the problem is not scalar one cannot easily take logarithms. In general explicit solutions are very rare.

CAVEAT 2: The boundedness (or at least a constraint on the blow-up) of M near the special points 1 and -1 is crucial. Otherwise any function of the form
 
is also a solution. In general, conditions on growth are necessary at special points (the end-points of the jump contour or intersection point) to ensure that the problem is well-posed.

See also 

 Riemann–Hilbert correspondence

References

.
.

.
.
.
.
.
.
.
.
.
.
.
.
.
.
.
.
.
.
.
.
.

External links 

Complex analysis
Exactly solvable models
Integrable systems
Solitons
Scattering theory
Harmonic analysis
Microlocal analysis
Ordinary differential equations
Partial differential equations
Mathematical problems
Bernhard Riemann
David Hilbert